Albulena Kryeziu (born August 27, 1986) is an Albanian actress from Kosovo. She made her acting debut in 2003 in "Debanti politik" in theater. She's best known for portraying Mimoza Ukaj in the soap opera Stinë dashurie and Tringa Belegu in the sitcom O sa mirë.

Life and career
Albulena Kryeziu was born in Gjakova, Kosovo (then SFR Yugoslavia) on August 27, 1986. She finished high school at Odhise Paskali school of arts in Pejë for acting. In 2008 she graduated from the University of Pristina, Faculty of Arts also for acting, and she's currently earning her master's degree in the same field.

Albulena has played many roles in film and in theatre. She has been part of the Professional Theatre of Gjakova, Dodona Theatre in Pristina, Albanian Theatre in Skopje and in Act Productions. She won the "Best Actress" awards in "Mediterranean Film Festival" in Italy and in DC Festival, France, both in 2016.

In August 2016 she married director Ilir Bokshi. On December 25, 2017, she gave birth to their son, Don Bokshi.

Film
2005: Anatema
2006: Vaska
2006: Tonight Is Cancelled
2007: Rikthimi
2007: E dehura
2009: Si Merlin
2009: Shiko botën
2009: Darka
2010: Këpuca
2010: Ashensori
2010: Kodi i jetës
2010: Sinner’s Pride
2010: Turpi
2010: Tri dritaret
2011: The Wedding Tape
2012: Kolona
2014: Dear Nita
2016: Cheating for Papers

Television
2009: Lexi në qytet
2009: SpitaliKS
2013: O sa mirë
2014-15: Stinë dashurie
2019-20: iStar

Theatre
2003: Debanti politik
2004: Lulëkuqet
2005: Shi në Uerto Monte
2005: Betohem se...
2005: Letër nga burgu... letër në burg
2005: Lumturizet
2006: Sekretet e dashurisë
2009: Tregimi zoologjik
2010: Vdekja dhe vasha
2010: Peer Gynt
2019: The 39 Steps
2020: Eshtrat që vijnë vonë
2020: Allo Allo!

Music video
2014: Arsye s'kam by Vali Kuqi

Awards
Best Actress Award at Mediterranean Film Festival, Italy (2016)
Best Actress Award at DC Festival, France (2016)

References

External links

1986 births
Albanian actresses
Kosovan actresses
Albanian stage actresses
Albanian film actresses
21st-century Albanian actresses
People from Gjakova
Living people